Les Marquis De Maison Mere was a band/group made after Bill Clinton Kalonji, Ferré Gola and JDT Mulpowe had a dispute with Werrason and decided to leave Wenge Musica Maison Mère (Werrason's orchestra). All of this happened in early 2004 with the leaving after a concert they had in London.

Les Marquis also had  famous soliste Japonais Maladi who had also left WMMM after double zenith in 2002.

Albums:

Miracle - 2004 

Democratic Republic of the Congo musical groups